Midway, Virginia may refer to:

Midway, Albemarle County, Virginia
Midway, Charlottesville
Midway, Giles County, Virginia
Midway, Halifax County, Virginia (disambiguation)
Midway (near Buffalo Springs), Halifax County, Virginia
Midway (near Scottsburg), Halifax County, Virginia
Midway, King William County, Virginia
Midway, Mecklenburg County, Virginia
Midway, Washington County, Virginia
Steeles Tavern, Virginia, formerly Midway
Wren, Virginia, formerly Midway
Midway (Millington, Virginia), a historic home

See also
Midway Heights, Virginia
Midway Island, Virginia
Midway Mills, Virginia